Fallow is a pale brown color that is the color of withered foliage or sandy soil in fallow fields.  

Fallow is one of the oldest color names in English. The first recorded use of fallow as a color name in English was in the year 1000. The color was historically often used to describe the coats of some animals, such as fallow deer.

The normalized color coordinates for fallow are identical to wood brown, camel and desert, which were first recorded as color names in English in 1886, 1916, and 1920, respectively.

See also 
List of colors

Notes

References

Bibliography

Citations

External links
ISCC-NBS Dictionary of Color Names (1955) - Color dictionary used by stamp collectors to identify the colors of stamps—See sample of the color Fallow (color sample #76) displayed on indicated page.

Shades of brown